792 Metcalfia is a minor planet orbiting the Sun. It was discovered in 1907 by Joel Hastings Metcalf and was named after its discoverer. It has a rotation period of 9.17 hours and spans 61 km. The best fit meteorite analog is Gorlovka OC sample RS-CMP-048.

See also
 List of minor planets: 1–1000

References

External links 
 
 

000792
Discoveries by Joel Hastings Metcalf
Named minor planets
000792
19070320